Tilman Baumgärtel (born 1966, Würzburg, Bavaria, Germany) is a German author, media theorist, curator and journalist. He is currently professor of media theory (department design) at the University of Applied Sciences, Mainz.

Life 
Tilman Baumgärtel has published books on media culture, Internet art, computer games, and Independent cinema in Southeast Asia. From 2005 to 2009 he taught at the University of the Philippines in Manila media and film studies. From 2009 to 2012, he taught at the Royal University of Phnom Penh in Cambodia at the Department of Media and Communication. Currently he is professor for media theory at the Hochschule Mainz.

His most recent publications is GIFs.

From 2018 to 2021 he was in charge of a DFG-research project  on the art group Van Gogh TV and their documenta project Piazza Virtuale.

As a journalist he has been writing since the early 1990s for the Berlin daily die tageszeitung, Die Zeit, the Neue Zürcher Zeitung, Telepolis, the Berliner Zeitung and other German and international newspapers and magazines.

Works 
Harun Farocki – Vom Guerillakino zum Essayfilm. Werkmonographie eines Autorenfilmer, Berlin 1998
net.art. Materials for net art, Nuremberg 1999
net.art 2.0. New materials for net art. New material on art on the internet (bi-lingual: English / German), Nuremberg 2001
install.exe, Basel 2003
games. Computer games by artists, Frankfurt / Main, 2004
Sine cinema. Philippine-German Cinema Relations, Manila 2007
The Calamansi Cookbook: An Expat's Guide to Eating Well in the Philippines, Manila 2009
KON. The Cinema of Cambodia, Phnom Penh 2010
DONTREY. The Music of Cambodia, Phnom Penh 2011
STHAPATYAM. The Architecture of Cambodia, Phnom Penh 2012
South East Asian Independent Cinema, Hong Kong 2012
Schleifen. Zur Geschichte und Ästhetik des Loops, Berlin 2015
Pirate Essays. A Reader in International Media Piracy, Amsterdam 2016
Texte zur Theorie des Internets, Stuttgart 2017
Texte zur Theorie der Werbung, Stuttgart 2018
Eintritt in ein Lebewesen – Von der Sozialen Skulptur zum Plattform-Kapitalismus, Berlin 2020 (Kunstraum Kreuzberg)
 GIFs, Berlin 2020 (Wagenbach Verlag)
Van Gogh TV´s "Piazza virtuale". The Invention of Social Media at documenta IX in 1992, Bielefeld 2021 (Transcript Verlag), eBook as Open Access file here.

Exhibitions as curator (Selection) 
Games. Computerspiele von KünstlerInnen, Hardware MedienKunstVerein Dortmund, 2003

Eintritt in ein Lebewesen, Kunstraum Kreuzberg, Berlin 2020

Is it Art or is it Internet, Vol 1., Upstream Gallery Amsterdam, 2021

Van Gogh TVs Piazza virtuale, Künstlerhaus Bethanien, Berlin 2021, Online-Version hier.

References

External links 
 
 Official website 
 Asian Edition
 KINO SINE BUCH
 KON. The Cinema of Cambodia (PDF; 6,9 MB)
 DONTREY. The Music of Cambodia (PDF; 2,3 MB)
 STHAPATYAM. The Architecture of Cambodia (PDF; 2,6 MB)
 Institute of Southeast Asian Film Studies - Blog on Southeast Asian cinema maintained by Tilman Baumgärtel
 "Southeast Asian Independent Cinema" book at Google Books
 Asian Edition
 KINO SINE BUCH
 KON. The Cinema of Cambodia (PDF; 6,9 MB)
 DONTREY. The Music of Cambodia (PDF; 2,3 MB)
 STHAPATYAM. The Architecture of Cambodia (PDF; 2,6 MB)
 Institute of Southeast Asian Film Studies - Blog on Southeast Asian cinema maintained by Tilman Baumgärtel
 "Southeast Asian Independent Cinema" book at Google Books
 Website for the book "Schleifen"

Mass media scholars
Academic staff of the University of Applied Sciences, Mainz
German male journalists
German journalists
1966 births
Writers from Würzburg
Living people
German male writers